Saline City is an unincorporated community in Saline County, in the U.S. state of Missouri.

History
Saline City was laid out in 1858, and named after the county in which it is located. A variant name was "Littlerock". A post office called Saline City was established in 1869, and closed in 1870, and a post office called Little Rock was in operation from 1878 until 1907.

References

Unincorporated communities in Saline County, Missouri
Unincorporated communities in Missouri